Nocna zmiana is a 1995 Polish documentary film about the events of the night 4 June 1992 when the collusion of all polish parliamentary forces has removed Olszewski's cabinet out of ruling the country. It was directed by Michał Balcerzak.

Featuring
 Donald Tusk
 Maciej Jankowski
 Piotr Semka
 Jacek Kurski
 Marian Krzaklewski
 Krzysztof Wyszkowski
 Mieczysław Wachowski
 Bogdan Borusewicz
 Jacek Maziarski
 Janusz Korwin-Mikke
 Józefa Hennelowa
 Jerzy Ciemniewski
 Jan Parys
 Lech Wałęsa
 Tomasz Lis
 Aleksander Kwaśniewski

Polish documentary films
Polish-language films